RjB 20, 21 and 22 were three diesel-hydraulic locomotives operated by Norsk Transport on Rjukanbanen in Norway. They were mostly used for shunting at Rjukan and at Mæl.

They were delivered in 1961, and remained in service until 1991 when the line closed; no. 20 remains at Rjukan, while no. 21 was sold to Pepeteries de Golbey of France and no. 22 was transferred to Norsk Hydro at Menstad.

References

Norsk Transport locomotives
Diesel locomotives of Norway
Railway locomotives introduced in 1961
1961 establishments in Norway
Standard gauge locomotives of Norway